The .56-56 Spencer was an American black powder rifle cartridge.

Designed for the Spencer rifle and carbine, patented 6 March 1860, it was employed by cavalry during the American Civil War, first appearing at Sharpsburg in rifle form. No Spencer carbines were on issue at the Battle of Gettysburg, though two units under Custer had the rifles. The .56-56 was loaded with a slug of 350–360 gr (22.7–23.3 g) over 42–45 gr (2.7–2.9 g) of black powder. It was loaded by a variety of companies, and was also used in the Ballard and Joslyn carbines. It is a short-ranged cartridge, ineffective on anything larger than deer. Commercially loaded ammunition continued to be available into the 1920s and 1930s.

Nomenclature
The nomenclature of Spencer cartridges was unique.  Unlike later cartridges such as the .44-40 Winchester and .45-70, where the first number indicated caliber and the second the charge weight, the .56-56 refers solely to the case.  The first 56 is the diameter of the case at the base .56 inches (14.2 mm), measured just past the rim, and the second 56 is the diameter at the case mouth, also . Later versions of the cartridge included the .56-52, .56-50, and .56-46, which had varying degrees of taper in the cases, to accommodate smaller diameter bullets. All of these cartridges are rimfire primed. The actual bullet diameter of the .56-56 varied between .54 and .555 inches (13.7–14.1 mm), depending on ammunition manufacturer.  The .56-52, made by Spencer, and the .56-50, made by Springfield, differed only in the degree of crimp, with the .56-50 having a greater crimp; both fired 350 grain  bullets.  The .56-46 fired a 320 to 330 grain  bullet.

See also
List of rifle cartridges
13 mm caliber

References

Pistol and rifle cartridges